Johnny May (born 1945) is a Canadian Inuk bush pilot living in Kuujjuaq, known as being the first Inuk pilot in eastern Canada. He is credited with saving the lives of many Inuit in search-and-rescue missions and operating medevac airplane services to transport sick Inuit to health centres. May is the older brother of Canadian Governor General, Mary Simon.

Family
His father was a non-Inuit manager of the Hudson Bay Company trading post in Fort Severight (now Kangiqsualujjuaq), while his mother was a local Inuk. Among his 7 siblings, his sister Mary Simon is a former president of Makivik Corporation, former diplomat and the current Governor General of Canada.

Career
May obtained his pilot's licence in 1962 after training in Pennsylvania. Through his company, Johnny May's Air Charters, he flew search-and-rescue missions in the Arctic tundra, as well as medevacs between Inuit villages and from Nunavik to hospitals in southern Canada.

He is known for his annual Christmas candy drop, which occurred annually from 1965 until 2019. On Christmas day, he would take his airplane and shower the village of Kuujjuaq with candy and gifts.

Legacy
He was inducted into the Québec Air and Space Hall of Fame in 2010. A movie about his life and career entitled The Wings of Johnny May was released in 2014 in English, French and Inuktitut. A children's book about his annual candy drop titled The Kuujjuaq Christmas Candy Drop by Linda Brand was released in 2015. In 2017 a short animated film was produced by the CBC called The Great Northern Candy Drop.

References

1945 births
Living people
Inuit from Quebec
Canadian aviators